Oh Jang-won (born 13 March 1998) is a South Korean footballer.

Career statistics

Club

Notes

References

1998 births
Living people
South Korean footballers
South Korean expatriate footballers
Association football midfielders
Challenger Pro League players
A.F.C. Tubize players
South Korean expatriate sportspeople in Belgium
Expatriate footballers in Belgium